The Rankins Springs railway line is a closed railway line in southwestern New South Wales, Australia. The line branched from the Lake Cargelligo line at the town of Barmedman, heading in a westerly direction to the town of Rankins Springs. It opened in 1923, and was constructed primarily to open up the agricultural areas in the vicinity. Passenger services were operated by CPH railmotors until the widespread withdrawal of country branchline trains in 1974. The line carried approximately 80,000 tonnes of grain per year, before being 'mothballed' in 2004.

Gallery

See also
 Rail transport in New South Wales

References

  

Closed regional railway lines in New South Wales
Standard gauge railways in Australia
Railway lines opened in 1923
Railway lines closed in 2004
1923 establishments in Australia